Dariusz Kowaluk (born 16 April 1996) is a Polish  sprinter specialising in the 400 metres. He won a silver medal in the 4 × 400 metres relay at the 2017 European U23 Championships as well as gold medal in the mixed 4 x 400 metres relay at the 2020 Summer Olympic Games.

International competitions

Personal bests
Outdoor
100 metres – 10.57 (+1.1 m/s, Szczecin 2018)
200 metres – 20.95 (+0.8 m/s, Szczecin 2018)
400 metres – 46.06 (Lublin 2018)
Indoor
200 metres – 21.71 (Spała 2018)
400 metres – 46.95 (Toruń 2018)

References

1996 births
Living people
Polish male sprinters
People from Włodawa
Universiade medalists in athletics (track and field)
Universiade bronze medalists for Poland
Medalists at the 2019 Summer Universiade
Competitors at the 2017 Summer Universiade
Athletes (track and field) at the 2020 Summer Olympics
Medalists at the 2020 Summer Olympics
Olympic gold medalists in athletics (track and field)
Olympic gold medalists for Poland
Olympic athletes of Poland
21st-century Polish people